Gorgopis libania is a moth of the family Hepialidae. It is found in South Africa and Angola. The larva feeds on grasses.

References

Hepialidae
Lepidoptera of Angola
Lepidoptera of Mozambique
Lepidoptera of South Africa
Moths of Sub-Saharan Africa
Moths described in 1781